Tom  or Thomas Dooley may refer to:

Folk figure
 Tom Dula (1845–1868), American figure of folk legend hanged in North Carolina for murder
"Tom Dooley" (song), American folksong based upon the above incident
 The Legend of Tom Dooley, a 1959 film starring Michael Landon, based on the folk song

People
 Thomas Anthony Dooley III (1927–1961), American humanitarian who worked in Laos and Vietnam 
 Thomas Dooley (born 1961), retired German-American footballer
 Thomas E. Dooley, American media executive
 Thomas P. Dooley, Judeo-Christian author, biomedical scientist, inventor
 Tom Dooley (American football) (1934–2018), American football official
 Tom Dooley (racewalker) (born 1945), American race walker at the 1968 and 1972 Olympics
 Tom Dooley (editor) (born 1970), American magazine editor
 Tom Dooley (footballer) (1914–1975), English footballer

See also
 Thomas Dooley Elementary School, Illinois

Dooley, Tom